The  is an  or  (painted narrative handscroll) from the Heian period of Japanese history (794–1185). It is also among the National Treasures of Japan, which enshrines the most inestimable cultural property of the nation.

Background
 
Originating in Japan in the sixth or seventh century through trade with the Chinese Empire,  art spread widely among the aristocracy in the Heian period. An  consists of one or more long scrolls of paper narrating a story through  texts and paintings. The narrative assumes a series of scenes, the rhythm, composition and transitions of which are entirely the artist's sensitivity and technique. The themes of the stories were very varied: illustrations of novels, historical chronicles, religious texts, biographies of famous people, humorous or fantastic anecdotes, etc.

During the Heian period, the illustrations of novels known as  became very fashionable at court, contributing to the professionalisation and improvement of the art of emaki which reached its maturity around the second half of the 12th century.

Description

The story centers on the romance between Nezame and a court counsellor (a ), by whom she becomes pregnant, but there are many obstacles that make this love impossible, including the fact that the counsellor is promised to Nezame's older sister, Ōigimi. Nezame is therefore forced to marry another man older than herself, for whom she develops a certain affection in the absence of love.

The scroll probably covers the last part of the novel. The author and the sponsor are unknown.

The first scene is dominated by Japanese cherry trees against a rich background sprinkled with dust of gold, silver and mica. Three young girls, one playing the flute and two holding a fan, sit under the trees. The lower left part reveals the interior of a rich house. The significance of the scene is uncertain, but it may be Nezame's visit to his beautiful daughter. The second scene shows a courtesan resting on a veranda under a Wisteria plant. Two people are playing music at the top of the stage, while Masako, Nezame's son, appears in the lower right corner. This is undoubtedly the visit of Masako to Sadaijin-no-nyōgo, wife of the Emperor. The third scene is that of Masako's visit to a courtesan to whom he wishes to declare his love. A reflection of the moon appears fleetingly in the garden stream, while the figures are visible through the openings of the veranda on the left. The fourth scene shows the emperor speaking with a priest about Nezame's letter; unlike the other scenes, the atmosphere here is religious and solemn.

Style and composition
The paintings in the  fit within the  genre of the  style fashionable from the 12th century to the end of the Heian period.  paintings are generally very stylized, elegant and refined, with rich, opaque colour used to represent the peaceful, romantic and often nostalgic atmosphere of the lives of the ladies at the Imperial Court.

A first sketch of the scene is made in India ink, then the colour is applied in a precise order, from the large areas in the background to the final details, following the instructions of the master sometimes annotated directly on the paper. Finally, the outlines are drawn again or enhanced in ink to accentuate the depth.

The so-called  technique, involving the removal of building roofs, was used to depict both the interior of a building and its exterior, be it a garden or a veranda, in the same scene.

Angles are also more abrupt in composition. The representation of nature is remarkable in these paintings: very elaborate, it subtly emphasises the feelings of the characters as well as a certain melancholy, ultimately taking precedence over the characters. As is often the case in Japanese painting, the season is clearly portrayed; here, spring is represented by cherry blossoms and wisteria.

Provenance
Since 22 November 1962, it has been classified as one of the National Treasures of Japan. The work is stored at the Museum of Japanese Art (Yamato Bunkakan) in Nara.

A copy from the Edo period made by Kanō Osanobu (Kanō school) is held by the Tokyo National Museum.

See also
List of National Treasures of Japan (paintings)

National Treasure (Japan)

References

Notes

Bibliography

External links

Emakimono
National Treasures of Japan